Pionersky is a rural locality (a selo) in Spartaksky Selsoviet, Yermekeyevsky District, Bashkortostan, Russia. The population was 220 as of 2010. There is 1 street.

Geography 
Pionersky is located 15 km southeast of Yermekeyevo (the district's administrative centre) by road. Spartak is the nearest rural locality.

References 

Rural localities in Yermekeyevsky District